Esko Salminen (6 July 1920 – 16 April 1998) was a Finnish field hockey player. He competed in the men's tournament at the 1952 Summer Olympics.

References

External links
 

1920 births
1998 deaths
Finnish male field hockey players
Olympic field hockey players of Finland
Field hockey players at the 1952 Summer Olympics
Sportspeople from Helsinki